The Video Standards Council (VSC), also known as the VSC Rating Board, is an administrator of the PEGI system of age rating for video games. It was established in 1989, originally with the purpose of enforcing the Video Recordings Act 1984 and educating retailers on its requirements. It has been statutorily responsible for the age ratings of video games sold in the United Kingdom since 2012. The organisation is accountable to the Department of Culture, Media and Sport.

History
The VSC was established in 1989 following concerns from then Home Secretary Douglas Hurd regarding the enforcement of the Video Recordings Act 1984. The organisation designed a code of practise to ensure that the recorded video and video game industries delivered their products to the public responsibly, as well as providing retailers with staff training courses concerning the supply of age restricted videos, DVDs and video games.

In 1994, the VSC first began administrating the age ratings of video games sold within the UK. Initially, they worked on behalf of the UK Interactive Entertainment Association (formerly ELSPA) via a voluntary system of game ratings which most publishers adopted. In 2003, the ELSPA ratings were replaced by the Pan European Game Information PEGI system. The VSC continues today to administrate the PEGI system alongside NICAM (Netherlands Institute for the Classification of Audiovisual Media); NICAM classifying games for ages 3 to 7, and the VSC classifying games for ages 12 and above.

In 2012, the government removed the responsibility of the British Board of Film Classification (BBFC) to rate video games except those containing strong pornographic content, passing responsibility to the VSC. At the same time, the PEGI system was incorporated into UK law. Since then, the VSC has been the statutory body responsible for the age rating of video games in the UK. From 2012 to 2017, the VSC branded the arm of their organisation fulfilling this responsibility as the Games Rating Authority. This branding was scrapped in 2017, and the new title of the VSC Rating Board adopted, to make it clearer that it was a division of the VSC rather than a separate entity. The VSC Rating Board also rates games for at least 30 other European countries.

References

External links
 Official website

Information technology organisations based in the United Kingdom
Organizations established in 1989
Video gaming in the United Kingdom
Video game censorship
British Board of Film Classification
Mass media companies